Apristurus manocheriani, also known by its common name Manocherian's catshark, is a species from the genus Apristurus. This species was originally described by Justin A. Cordova and David A. Ebert in 2021.

Etymology
The cat shark is named  in honor of Greg Manocherian (b. 1967), an American philanthropist, because of his  commitment to shark conservation and research.

Description 
The species is a Catshark with a "porcelain" white body color with a pink tint, it has a maximum total length of at least 558 mm for males and 495 mm for females.

Range 
Apristurus manocheriani is only found in the southwest Indian Ocean

Taxonomy 
The species is part of the Apristurus spongiceps subgroup  of the Genus Apristurus.

References

manocheriani
Taxa named by Justin A. Cordova
Taxa named by David A. Ebert
Fish described in 2021